An imperial guard or palace guard is a special group of troops (or a member thereof) of an empire, typically closely associated directly with the Emperor or Empress. Usually these troops embody a more elite status than other imperial forces, including the regular armed forces, and maintain special rights, privileges and traditions.

Because the head of state often wishes to be protected by the best soldiers available, their numbers and organisation may be expanded to carry out additional tasks. Napoleon's Imperial Guard is an example of this. 

In heterogeneous polities reliant on a greater degree of coercion to maintain central authority the political reliability and loyalty of the guard is the most important factor in their recruitment. In such cases the ranks of the guard may be filled with on the one hand royal kinsman and clansman with a stake in the survival of the ruling family, and on the other with members socially and culturally divorced from the general population and therefore reliant on imperial patronage for their survival, for example the Varangian Guards (recruiting solely foreigners), and the Janissaries (Christian children taken as slaves from childhood, to serve the Muslim sultan).

In the post-colonial period, the term has been used colloquially and derisively to describe the staff of a person, usually a politician or corporate executive officer, that acts to prevent direct communication with the person.

List of imperial guards

Africa 
 Mehal Sefari and Kebur Zabagna of the Ethiopian Empire

Americas 
 Imperial Guard of the Archers, Brazilian Imperial bodyguards during the Empire of Brazil

Asia 
 Chinese
 The 8000 Terracotta Warriors protecting the Emperor of China in the afterlife. 
 The Northern Army of the Han Dynasty was the standing professional army branch of the Han Empire, garrisoned around the capital. Several units from this army would be given the honor of guarding the emperor in the capitol.
 The Feathered Forest (imperial guards unit composed of primarily or entirely cavalry) [Elite Yulin] of the Army of the Han dynasty
 The Rapid as Tigers (imperial guards unit) [Elite Huben] of the Army of the Han dynasty
 Imperial Guards (Tang dynasty), formed initially as honour bodyguards of the emperor and garrison of the capital, and evolved to reflect the era's transition of reliance on professional soldiery over non-professional volunteers and conscripts.
 Imperial Guards Brigade of Manchu Banner soldiers, entrusted with guarding the person of the Emperor of China and the Forbidden City during the Qing dynasty
 Imperial Guard of Manchukuo

 Iranian
 The 10,000-strong Immortals, an elite heavy infantry unit of the Achaemenid Empire from 550 BC–330 BC, functioning as both an Imperial Guard and a faction of the Achaemenid army
 The Immortals, the Iranian Imperial Guard, existing in Iran in the 20th century under the Pahlavi dynasty

 Elsewhere
 The Immortals, Nihang warriors or Sikh Akalis who have played the pivotal role in Sikh military history
 Janissaries and baltadji of the Ottoman Empire
 Kheshig of the Mongol Empire
 Imperial Guard (Japan) in service protection of the Emperor of Japan. Later part of the Japanese Army and since 1947, an integration of the National Police of Japan.

Europe 
 French
 Imperial Guard (Napoleon I) and Mamelukes of the Imperial Guard of the First French Empire.
 Imperial Guard (Napoleon III) of the Second French Empire

 Germanic
 The Guards Corps of the Prussian, and later of the Imperial German Army
 The Austrian Imperial Guard during the Austrian Empire and then the Austrian-Hungarian Empire. 

 Roman and Byzantine
 The Praetorian Guard of the Imperial Roman Army in Ancient Rome, from 27 BC – 312 AD.
 The Equites singulares Augusti, Imperial Horse Guards of the Roman Emperors
 Jovians and Herculians, elite Guards legions during the Tetrarchy
 Scholae Palatinae, late Roman Imperial Guards in both Western and Eastern Empires. Established in ca. 312, in the West until the 490s, in Byzantine service until ca. 1080.
 Excubitors, Byzantine imperial guards established under the Byzantine emperor Leo I the Thracian
 Spatharioi, Byzantine palace guards in the 5th-8th centuries
 Tagmata, elite Byzantine guard units in the 8th-11th centuries
 Hetaireia, Byzantine mercenary guard composed of men from Eastern Europe and Central Asia in the 9th-12th centuries
 Varangian Guard, Byzantine palace guards and elite soldiers in the 10th-15th centuries

 Elsewhere
 Alemannic Guard of Emperor of the Serbs Stefan Uroš IV Dušan the Mighty. 
 The Imperial Guard (also known as the Leib Guard) of the Russian Tsars.

Gallery

Fiction 
The term has been used in fiction:
 Imperial Guard, a group of alien warriors in the Marvel Comics universe that are charged with the duty of serving the Shi'ar Empire.
 Emperor's Royal Guard, Emperor Palpatine's personal protectors in the Star Wars universe.
 The Imperial Guard is the standing army of the Imperium in the Warhammer 40,000 universe.  However, the Adeptus Custodes (rather than the Guard, despite their name) actually plays the role of the Emperor's privileged personal guards.
 The Crimson Brigade, the Empire of Izmir's elite fighting unit in the 2000 film titled: Dungeons & Dragons.
 The Sardaukar of the Padishah Emperor and the Fremen Fedaykin of Paul Muad'dib, plus their successors the Fish Speakers both serve as imperial guards in Frank Herbert's Dune saga.
 The Imperial Guard of the planet Andor as seen on the TV series Star Trek: Enterprise.

See also 
 List of empires
 List of largest empires
 List of extinct countries, empires, etc.
 Imperial Army and Imperial Navy
 Republican guard
 National guard

References

External links 
 

 
Royal guards